The Democratic Rally (ΔΗΣΥ/DISY) is a liberal-conservative, Christian-democratic political party in Cyprus led by Annita Demetriou. The party was founded on 4 July 1976 by veteran politician Glafcos Clerides. Clerides served as the president of Cyprus from 1993 until 2003. From 11 March 2023, the leader of the party is Annita Demetriou, who also serves as the president of the House of Representatives from June 2021.

Overview
DISY is a member of the European People's Party (EPP). In the 2014 European Parliamentary Election it  elected 2 MEPs, who joined the EPP Group.

DISY serves a widely diverse spectrum of voters, ranging from hard-line Greek Cypriot nationalists and anti-communists to humanist liberals with post-materialist and post-modern values who advocate human rights. DISY's platform focuses on free enterprise economic policies, lower direct taxes and higher indirect taxes, economic development, opposing government deficits, investments in infrastructure, and a practical solution to the Cyprus dispute (though the party base is traditionally more hawkish and hard-line than the party leadership). It is the most explicitly Atlanticist and pro-NATO of Cyprus's parties, and draws its support from middle-class professionals, businessmen, and white-collar employees.

The leadership of the Democratic Rally is generally less hard-line than the party base, and in 2004 supported the Annan Plan for the re-unification of Cyprus, believing that further adjustments could be made afterwards. Following the Plan's overwhelming rejection by the Greek Cypriot Community, four MPs (Sillouris, Prodromou, Erotokritou, Taramoundas) who had opposed the party line were expelled and a number of members willingly resigned. The expelled MPs formed a party called European Democracy. In 2005 European Democracy merged with New Horizons and created European Party. Former party president Yiannakis Matsis headed a splinter coalition called For Europe in the European Parliamentary Election. Matsis gained a seat in the European parliament, also joining the EPP group (while still remaining a member of DISY).

In 2013, Nicos Anastasiades of the Democratic Rally, was elected as the President of Cyprus. In 2018,  President Anastasiades was re-elected tor a second term with a wide margin over his communist opponent.

Election results

Parliament
In the legislative elections of 21 May 2006, the party won 30.52% of the popular vote and 18 out of 56 available seats, and in the legislative elections of 22 May 2011, the party won 34.27% of the popular vote and 20 out of 56 available seats. The party's candidate, Nicos Anastasiades, won the 2013 presidential elections, ending five years of rule by the Progressive Party of Working People (AKEL). In the legislative elections of 2016, the party won 30.68%, taking 18 seats in the parliament and remaining the party with the largest representation.

European Parliament

Presidential elections

Party leaders

See also
 Reduction of military conscription in Cyprus

References

Further reading

External links

Nedisy.org, Youth branch

 
Political parties established in 1976
1976 establishments in Cyprus
Christian democratic parties in Europe
International Democrat Union member parties
Liberal conservative parties
Political parties in Cyprus
Member parties of the European People's Party
Pro-European political parties in Cyprus